Indira Levak (also known by her stage name Indira Forza; born 15 September 1973) is a Croatian singer. She was the lead vocalist of a Croatian dance music trio, Colonia.

Biography
Indira was born to Croatian father Franjo and Bosniak mother Ismeta on 15 September 1973 in Županja. She was named after then-Prime Minister of India Indira Gandhi. At the age of twelve she became a member of Županja Brass Band, where she played clarinet for thirteen years. In eighth grade she founded a band with four colleagues - "Forever young". From 1996 to 2017 she was a member of popular dance group Colonia.

She was married to Narcis Mujkić, but they divorced. In 2014 Indira married Miroslav Levak. Since 2015, she is a judge of Croatian version of The Voice.

Discography

With Colonia
Vatra i led (1997)
Ritam ljubavi (1999)
Jača nego ikad (2000)
Milijun milja od nigdje (2001)
Izgubljeni svijet (2002)
Dolazi oluja (2003)
Najbolje od svega (2005)
Do kraja (2007)
Pod sretnom zvijezdom (2008)
X (2010)
Tvrđava (2013)
Feniks (2015)

Solo
Valkira (2018)
Atlantida (2022)

Filmography

Television roles

References

1973 births
Living people
People from Županja
Hayat Production artists
Croatian pop singers
21st-century Croatian women singers
Croatian people of Bosniak descent